This is a list of films produced by the Ollywood film industry based in Bhubaneshwar and Cuttack in 1999:

A-Z

References

1999
 Ollywood
1990s in Orissa
Ollywood
1999 in Indian cinema